Wilbur "Doc" Little (March 5, 1928 – May 4, 1987) was an American jazz bassist known for playing hard bop and post-bop.

Little originally played piano, but switched to double bass after serving in the military. In 1949 he moved to Washington, D.C., where he worked with "Sir" Charles Thompson, among others. After that, he was in J. J. Johnson's quintet from 1955 to 1958 and was also the bassist for the Tommy Flanagan Trio. He moved to the Netherlands in 1977 and lived there for the rest of his life.

Discography

As sideman
With Tommy Flanagan
Overseas (Prestige, 1957)
With Buck Hill
Easy to Love (SteepleChase, 1981 [1982])
Impressions (SteepleChase, 1981 [1983])
With Freddie Hubbard
Jam Gems: Live at the Left Bank (Label M, 1965)
With Elvin Jones
Live at the Village Vanguard (Enja, 1968)
Poly-Currents (Blue Note, 1969)
The Prime Element (Blue Note, 1969)
Coalition (Blue Note, 1970)
With J. J. Johnson
J Is for Jazz (Columbia, 1956)
Dial J. J. 5 (Columbia, 1957)
J. J. in Person! (Columbia, 1958)
With Duke Jordan
Live in Japan (SteepleChase, 1976 [1977])
Flight to Japan (SteepleChase, 1976 [1978])
Tivoli One (SteepleChase, 1978, [1984])
Tivoli Two (SteepleChase, 1978, [1984])
Wait and See (SteepleChase, 1978 [1994])
With Lee Konitz
Oleo (Sonet, 1975) 
With Junior Mance
Live at the Top (Atlantic, 1968)
With Horace Parlan
Blue Parlan (Steeplechase, 1978)
Hi-Fly (Steeplechase, 1978)
With Roswell Rudd
 Blown Bone (Philips, 1979)
With Archie Shepp
Little Red Moon (Soul Note, 1985)
With Randy Weston
Live at the Five Spot (United Artists, 1959)

External links
Biography at Allmusic

American jazz double-bassists
Male double-bassists
20th-century American musicians
20th-century double-bassists
20th-century American male musicians
American male jazz musicians
1928 births
1987 deaths